William Gabriel Plunkett (2 May 1914 – 21 July 1960) was an Australian rules footballer who played with Geelong in the Victorian Football League (VFL).

After playing with Geelong in 1935, Plunkett returned to Geelong District football for a few years before reappearing in senior ranks with Port Melbourne in 1940.

Plunkett later served in the Australian Army during World War II.

Notes

External links 

Bill Plunkett's playing statistics from The VFA Project

1914 births
1960 deaths
Australian rules footballers from Victoria (Australia)
Geelong Football Club players
Port Melbourne Football Club players
Australian Army personnel of World War II
Australian Army soldiers